Paul McNamee (born 12 November 1954) is an Australian former doubles world No. 1 tennis player and prominent sports administrator.

Tennis career

Juniors
In his hometown, McNamee won the boys' singles tournament at the 1973 Australian Open.

Pro tour
McNamee is the only player to switch a grip as a professional, changing from a one-handed backhand to two-handed in 1979. He won two singles and twenty-three doubles titles during his professional career. A right-hander, he reached his highest singles ATP-ranking on 12 May 1986 when he became the world No. 24. McNamee reached his highest doubles ATP-ranking on 8 June 1981 when he became the world No. 1. McNamee won 24 men's doubles titles including four Grand Slam doubles titles in his career.  He won the 1979 Australian Open and the 1980 and 1982 Wimbledon Championships with Peter McNamara and the 1983 Australian Open with Mark Edmondson. He won the mixed-doubles title in Wimbledon with Martina Navratilova in 1985.

When John McEnroe won Wimbledon in 1984, McNamee was the only player to take a set off McEnroe throughout the entire championship when he won the third set of their first-round match.

McNamee was also a member of the Australian Davis Cup Team which won the Davis Cup in 1983 and 1986.

In 1987, McNamee became Melbourne's last officially crowned King of Moomba, subsequently a Moomba Monarch was selected (male Monarchs were popularly, but unofficially, still called King of Moomba).

Sports administrator
McNamee played a key role in the founding of the Hopman Cup international tennis tournament in 1988. He served as tournament director of the Hopman Cup and CEO of the Australian Open until 2006.

From 2006 to 2008 he was the tournament director for Golf Australia of the Australian Golf Open. He also served as the CEO of the Melbourne Football Club from March to July 2008.

In late 2008, it was revealed that McNamee has joined the push for Australia to field a cycling team at the Tour de France – with support from Cadel Evans as a consultant for Australian Road Cycling, a Melbourne-based consortium.

Career finals

Singles (2 titles, 5 runner-ups)

Doubles (23 titles, 15 runner-ups)

Notes

References

External links
 
 
 

1954 births
Living people
Australian male tennis players
Australian Open (tennis) champions
Australian Open (tennis) junior champions
Melbourne Football Club CEOs
People educated at St. Bernard's College, Melbourne
Tennis players from Melbourne
Wimbledon champions
Grand Slam (tennis) champions in men's doubles
Grand Slam (tennis) champions in boys' singles
ATP number 1 ranked doubles tennis players